Pogost is a rural locality (a village) in Novoselskoye Rural Settlement, Kovrovsky District, Vladimir Oblast, Russia. The population was 141 as of 2010.

Geography 
Pogost is located on the Nerekhta River, 7 km west of Kovrov (the district's administrative centre) by road. Kovrov is the nearest rural locality.

References 

Rural localities in Kovrovsky District